Kölükök is a mountain lake in the Naryn Region of Kyrgyzstan (Central Asia).

The approximately 2.5 km long lake with SSE-NNW orientation has an area of 1.22 km2 and is located at an altitude of 2970 m. The Ükök, outflow of the lake, initially flows in a north-westerly and later in a northerly direction through the mountains before reaching a plateau, flowing through the town of Kochkor and flowing into the river Chu on the right.

References 

Lakes of Kyrgyzstan
Naryn Region